is a Japanese football player who plays for Vegalta Sendai of the J2 League as a goalkeeper.

National team career
In July 2007, Hayashi was elected Japan U-20 national team for 2007 U-20 World Cup. At this tournament, he played 3 matches.

Vahid Halilhodžić called up Hayashi for 2018 FIFA World Cup qualifiers against Singapore and Cambodia in November 2015.

Club statistics
Updated to 26 November 2022.

Honours

Individual
 J.League Best XI: 2019

References

External links

Profile at FC Tokyo

1987 births
Living people
Ryutsu Keizai University alumni
People from Higashiyamato, Tokyo
Association football people from Tokyo Metropolis
Japanese footballers
J1 League players
Plymouth Argyle F.C. players
R. Olympic Charleroi Châtelet Farciennes players
Shimizu S-Pulse players
Sagan Tosu players
FC Tokyo players
Association football goalkeepers
Universiade bronze medalists for Japan
Universiade medalists in football
Medalists at the 2009 Summer Universiade